Seatons is a village in Saint Philip Parish, located on eastern Antigua island in Antigua and Barbuda.

Geography
Seatons is located to the west of Willkie's, close to the island's northeastern coast. 

Crump Island lies immediately to the north of Seatons.

Demographics 
Seatons has two enumeration districts.

 61100 Seatons-Central 
 61200 Seatons-Coastal

Census Data (2011)

Notable people from Seatons Village
 Dame Gwendolyn Tonge (1923–2012) Senator, Women's Desk supervisor, "Auntie Gwen" television personality

See also

References

Populated places in Antigua and Barbuda
Saint Philip Parish, Antigua and Barbuda